The korfball event at the 2001 World Games in Akita, Japan took place between the 18th and the 22nd of August. A total of 96 athletes from 6 national teams entered the competition. The competition took place in Aspal Gymnasium.

Competition format
In preliminary round teams played in two groups. Winners of the groups advanced to the final. Second place teams played with third place teams, and winners of this match advanced to the bronze medal final. Also fifth place match was held.

Teams
  Australia 
  Belgium 
  Chinese Taipei 
  Great Britain 
  Netherlands 
  Portugal

Preliminary round

Group A

Group B

Knockout stage

3–6th place semifinals

Fifth place game

Third place game

Final

Final ranking

References

External links
 International Korfball Federation
 Korfball on IWGA website
 Results

2001
2001 World Games
Yokote, Akita